Wattisham Airfield is an operational Army Airfield located next to the village of Wattisham in Suffolk, England. It is home to 3 Regiment Army Air Corps and 4 Regiment Army Air Corps. They are part of the Attack Helicopter Force (AHF) within the Joint Helicopter Command (JHC), whose headquarters is at Army Headquarters. They fly the Westland WAH-64 Apache helicopter.

Also located at Wattisham is 7 Aviation Close Support Battalion REME with a helicopter repair facility with worldwide capability, and 132 Aviation Supply Unit Royal Logistic Corps. The RAF maintains a presence at the airfield with a section of Survival Equipment Specialists who maintain survival equipment carried by Apache aircrew including their helmets.

Apart from the military, the Anglia Gliding Club also operates from the airfield. (making it the oldest serving member of Wattisham, having been there as a RAFGSA club when the RAF occupied). Also resident is No 1287 Sqn, Air Training Corps.

There are 2,000 troops stationed on site with 600 houses for married personnel between Wattisham, Hadleigh and Ipswich. There are 300 Heavy Goods Vehicle s, 200 Land Rovers, over 40 military helicopters and casual access for 2 Air Ambulances.

There is a museum on site which tells the history of the airfield and this is open on Sundays during April to October.

History

Wattisham Airfield has had a long and distinguished history. First opening in April 1939 the airfield was used by the RAF before being lent to the United States Army Air Forces in 1942. After the Second World War Wattisham became one of the UK's front-line air force fighter airfields during the Cold War with aircraft on Quick Reaction Alert on a rotational basis with other UK fighter stations.

Wattisham used to house 'B' Flight, 22 Squadron Royal Air Force with its Search & Rescue Sea King helicopters, until the privatisation of SAR provision in 2015, which led to 22 Squadron standing down. The closest SAR base under the new Bristow Helicopters contract is Lydd Airport in Kent.

As of 1 November 2018, there were 852 personnel assigned to 3 and 4 Regiments and 429 to 7 Aviation Support Battalion.

Operational units
Flying and notable non-flying units based at Wattisham Airfield.

British Army 
Joint Helicopter Command / Army Air Corps
 Attack Helicopter Force
3 Regiment
653 Squadron – Apache AH1
 662 Squadron – Apache AH1
 663 Squadron – Apache AH1
 4 Regiment
656 Squadron – Apache AH1
 664 Squadron – Apache AH1

Royal Electrical and Mechanical Engineers (16 Air Assault Brigade)
 7 Aviation Support Battalion
 HQ Company
 71 Aviation Company (Aviation Support Company)
 72 Aviation Company (Contingency Company)
 132 Aviation Supply Squadron (Royal Logistic Corps)
Royal Engineers (8 Engineer Brigade, 12 (Force Support) Engineer Group)
 Headquarters 20 Works Group Royal Engineers (Air Support)
 533 Specialist Team Royal Engineers (Airfields) (STRE)

References

External links
 Wattisham Airfield by Wattisham Aviation Society
 About the airfield at controltowers.co.uk
 History of Wattisham
 Another history

Wattisham
Airports in the East of England
Army Air Corps airfields
Gliderports in the United Kingdom